Lars Mikael Damberg (born 13 October 1971) is a Swedish politician of the Social Democratic Party. He served as Minister for Finance from 2021 to 2022. He previously served as Minister for Enterprise from October 2014 to January 2019 and as minister for home affairs from January 2019 to November 2021.

He has been Member of the Riksdag since 2002, representing Stockholm County, and was leader of the Social Democrats in the Riksdag from 2012 to 2014.

Political career and education 
Damberg was born in Solna, Stockholm County, Sweden. His father is the former Swedish Social Democratic party treasurer Nils-Gösta Damberg and his mother a former district chairwoman of the Finnish Social Democratic Youth Riita-Liisa Damberg. Damberg earned a degree in public administration from Stockholm University in 2000.

Early career 
Between 1995 and 1997, Damberg worked as a political assistant to Minister for Defence Thage G. Peterson, and between 1997 and 1999 as political assistant and speechwriter to Prime Minister Göran Persson. Between 1999 and 2003, he was chairman of the Swedish Social Democratic Youth League.

Political career 
Damberg joined the Swedish Social Democratic Youth League in the late 1980s and served as a member of the board of the organization between 1993 and 1997. He also served as a member of the municipal council in Solna Municipality between 1991 and 2002. He is chairman of the Social Democratic party district in Stockholm County since 2004.

Member of the Swedish Parliament, 2002–present 
Damberg has served as a member of the Swedish parliament since 2002, representing the Stockholm County constituency. In the parliament he served as deputy chairman of the Committee on Education and as a member of the War Delegation. He has served as a member of the Committee on Education since 2002. He previously served as a deputy member of the Committee on Defence between 2002 and 2006, and as a deputy member of the Committee on Finance between 2006 and 2010.

Minister of Enterprise 
Damberg was appointed Minister for Enterprise on 3 October 2014, serving in the cabinet of Prime Minister Stefan Löfven.

In this capacity, Damberg put forward a 2016 bill stipulating at least 40 percent of board members of listed firms should be women by 2019 at the latest; however, the government later decided to not go ahead with the proposal.

Also in 2016, Damberg approved Vattenfall’s decision to sell its loss-making lignite coal mines and associated power plants in Germany to Czech investor EPH. In 2018, he approved an application from Nord Stream 2 to lay two gas pipelines through its economic zone in the Baltic Sea. In August 2018, Damberg visited the crime scene where Karolin Hakim was killed by a gang member.

Damberg also attended the Bilderberg Meeting in 2015 in Telfs-Buchen, Austria.

Minister for Home Affairs 
Damberg was later appointed minister for home affairs on 21 January 2019 in the second Löfven Cabinet.

Early in his tenure, Damberg coordinated the Swedish government’s efforts seeking support from European allies for a new international tribunal to prosecute Islamic State fighters and military personnel for war crimes perpetrated in Iraq and Syria, modelled on the International Criminal Tribunal for Rwanda and the International Criminal Tribunal for the former Yugoslavia. Among others, he visited counterparts in the United Kingdom and the Netherlands to lobby support for the proposal.

When Dan Eliasson, the head of Swedish Civil Contingencies Agency (MSB), was reported to have holidayed with family on Gran Canaria in violation of guidelines propagated by his own agency against unnecessary travel amid the COVID-19 pandemic in Sweden, Damberg asked for his resignation.

Also during his time in office, Damberg led efforts in 2021 to give police greater powers to access mobile communications data, including conversations using apps like Facebook Messenger and WhatsApp. That same year, he appointed a commission to look at measures including the expansion of secret, preventative surveillance of suspects, currently only allowed in cases related to national security.

Minister of Finance 
Damberg was appointed Minister of Finance on 30 November 2021 after Magdalena Andersson became prime minister.

Other activities 
 Asian Infrastructure Investment Bank (AIIB), Ex-Officio Member of the Board of Governors (since 2021)
 European Bank for Reconstruction and Development (EBRD), Ex-Officio Member of the Board of Governors (since 2021)
 European Investment Bank (EIB), Ex-Officio Member of the Board of Governors (since 2021)
 Multilateral Investment Guarantee Agency (MIGA), World Bank Group, Ex-Officio Member of the Board of Governors (since 2021)
 Nordic Investment Bank (NIB), Ex-Officio Chairwoman of the Board of Governors (since 2021)
 World Bank, Ex-Officio Member of the Board of Governors (since 2021)

References

External links 

 Mikael Damberg at the Swedish Social Democratic Party
 Mikael Damberg at the Swedish parliament

Living people
1971 births
People from Solna Municipality
Members of the Riksdag from the Social Democrats
Stockholm University alumni
Swedish people of Finnish descent
Members of the Riksdag 2002–2006
Members of the Riksdag 2006–2010
Members of the Riksdag 2010–2014
Members of the Riksdag 2014–2018
Members of the Riksdag 2018–2022
Swedish Ministers for Finance
Interior ministers of Sweden
Members of the Riksdag 2022–2026